Straight from the Barrio is the fourth studio album by American metalcore band Upon a Burning Body, released on October 28, 2016, on the Sumerian Records label.

Track listing 
Lyrics by Danny Leal and Ruben Alvarez

Credits
 Upon a Burning Body
 Danny Leal - vocals
 Ruben Alvarez - guitars
 Rey Martinez - bass
 Ramon Villareal - drums

Charts

References

External links
 

2016 albums
Upon a Burning Body albums
Sumerian Records albums